Nevello Cosmas Yoseke (born March 17, 1996) is a soccer player who plays as a defender or a midfielder. Born in Sudan, he represented Canada at the 2013 FIFA U-17 World Cup.

Early life
Yoseke was born in Kharthoum, Sudan and has four siblings. When he was four years old, he moved to Cairo, Egypt with his family, before once again his family moved to Ottawa, Ontario when he was ten. He began playing organized youth soccer when he was 11 with Ottawa Internationals SC. Later he was part of the Ottawa Fury Academy. After a few years in the Fury system, in September 2011, he had a tryout with the U16 side of Brazilian top division team Cruzeiro, where he impressed and stayed for four months before returning to Canada due to a visa issue. Upon his return, he was seen by a scout and soon joined the Montreal Impact Academy.

Club career
In 2015, after his time in the Montreal Impact Academy he signed with FC Montreal of the second-tier USL, the second team of the Impact. He made his debut on August 29, as a substitute, against the Harrisburg City Islanders.

In 2017, he joined Swedish third division side Oskarshamns AIK.

Afterwards, he joined French club AS Saint-Priest on trial for three months, however he encountered visa issues and was unable to be signed. He subsequently returned to Canada and trained with his hometown club Ottawa Fury FC of the USL Championship.

In April 2019, he signed with AFC Ann Arbor of the American fourth tier National Premier Soccer League.

After the season, he returned to Canada, playing with Ottawa South United in League1 Ontario.

He subsequently returned to AS Saint-Priest before returning to Canada in June 2020. He returned to Ottawa South United, now part of the Première Ligue de soccer du Québec.

In 2021, he began the season with the Des Moines Menace of USL League Two, before moving to the Dayton Dutch Lions of USL League Two, before ending it with Kalamazoo FC.

Late in 2021, he joined New Amsterdam FC in National Independent Soccer Association.

In 2022, he played amateur soccer with Gloucester Celtic, helping them win the Challenge Trophy, as Canadian national amateur champions.

International career
In 2013, Yoseke was named to the Canada U17 national team for the 2013 FIFA U-17 World Cup. He made his debut on October 19, against Austria U17.

Career statistics

References

External links
 

1996 births
Living people
People from Khartoum
Soccer players from Ottawa
Sudanese emigrants to Egypt
Sudanese emigrants to Canada
Naturalized citizens of Canada
Canadian soccer players
Association football defenders
Association football midfielders
Canada men's youth international soccer players
Canadian people of Sudanese descent
Canadian people of South Sudanese descent
Canadian sportspeople of African descent
Sportspeople of South Sudanese descent
Black Canadian soccer players
Canadian expatriate soccer players
Canadian expatriate sportspeople in Sweden
Expatriate footballers in Sweden
Canadian expatriate sportspeople in the United States
Expatriate soccer players in the United States
Ottawa South United players
Première ligue de soccer du Québec players